Ben Thrash (May 7, 1897 – February 26, 1966) was an American diver. He competed in the men's plain high diving event at the 1924 Summer Olympics.

References

External links
 

1897 births
1966 deaths
American male divers
Olympic divers of the United States
Divers at the 1924 Summer Olympics
People from Frontier County, Nebraska